20 to One (known as 20 to 1 before 2016) is an Australian television series on the Nine Network from 2005, that counts down an undefined "top 20" of elements or events of popular culture, such as films, songs, or sporting scandals. The format mixes archival footage of the listed events with comments from various Australian celebrities.

Originally the show was hosted by Bud Tingwell and narrated by David Reyne; the pair were replaced by Bert Newton as host for the second season. The series was rebooted by the Nine Network and returned for its eleventh season on 31 May 2016 with new hosts, Australian radio presenters Fitzy and Wippa.  From 2017, the show was hosted by Erin Molan and Dave Thornton.

Format 
Each episode counts down the "top twenty" events following a particular theme, from position 20 down to number 1. Media clips depicting the event are played as the host provides background information of the entry. This is followed by clips of celebrities providing judgment on the clip or event.

Controversy 
During the segment aired on 19 June 2019, co-hosts Erin Molan and Nick Cody stated that the South Korean boy band BTS was "so popular it could heal the rift between North and South Korea." She also mentioned the band's success in the United States, even though "only one band member actually speaks English." among other comments. Many other celebrities made similar comments during the segment. Most notably was comedian Jimmy Carr, who jokingly compared the band's international success to the explosion of a nuclear bomb in North Korea, saying: "When I first heard something Korean had exploded in America, I got worried. So I guess, it could've been worse – but not much worse." Subsequently, the hashtags #channel9apologize and #channel9racist started trending as fans of the band demanded an apology from Channel 9. The BTS Australia Twitter fan account wrote: "This is unfair and presenting inaccurate information. You disregarded their achievements, and instead let your xenophobic, racist mindsets be biased instead. We want an apology." On 20 June 2019, Channel 9 issued a non-apology apology, writing: "We apologize to any who may have been offended by last night's episode."

Series overview

Episodes

Season One (2005)

Season Two (2006)

Season Three (2006)

Season Four (2007)

Season Five (2007-08)

Season Six (2008)

Season Seven (2008-09)

Season Eight (2009)

Season Nine (2010)

Season Ten (2011)

Season Eleven (2016)

Season Twelve (2017)

Celebrity contributors
This is a partial list (some in order of appearance) of the celebrities who contributed comments to 20 to One.

2005–2011
 Amanda Keller – TV and Radio Presenter
 Anh Do – Comedian
 Anthony Callea – Singer
 Ash & Luttsy – Radio Personalities
 Ben Dark – TV Presenter
 Bianca Dye – Radio Presenter
 Bill Collins – Movie Reviewer
 Billy Birmingham – Comedian
 Blair McDonough – Reality TV Star / Actor
 Bob Willis – Former English Cricket Captain
 Brendan Jones – Radio Presenter
 Brodie Harper – TV Presenter
 Cameron Daddo – Actor
 Catriona Rowntree – TV Presenter
 Charles "Bud" Tingwell – Actor and Previous Host of 20 to 1 (Series 2 to 7)
 Colin Lane – Comedian
 Damian Walshe-Howling – Actor
 Danny Bonaduce – TV and Radio Host
 David Campbell – Singer
 David Hasselhoff – American Actor
 Deni Hines – Singer
 Donny Osmond – Singer
 Duncan Armstrong – Olympic Athlete
 Ed Phillips – TV Presenter
 Eddie McGuire – TV Presenter
 Georgie Gardner – News presenter
 Gorgi Coghlan – TV Presenter
 Guy Sebastian – Singer
 Harry M. Miller – Personal Management
 Imogen Bailey – Actress and Model
 Ita Buttrose – Journalist and Author
 Jay Laga'aia – Actor  / Play School presenter
 Jessica Napier – Actress
 Jessica Rowe – Seven News presenter
 Jessica Tovey – Actress
 John Burgess – Former Game Show Host
 John Jarratt – Actor
 John-Michael Howson – Entertainment Reporter
 Josh Lawson – Actor
 Kate Ceberano – Singer
 Ken Sutcliffe – Sports Presenter
 Kristian Schmid – Actor
 Lisa Wilkinson – TV Presenter
 Livinia Nixon – TV Presenter
 Liz Ellis – Retired Netball Player
 Lizzy Lovette – Radio announcer
 Lorraine Bayly – Actress
 Lochie Daddo – TV Presenter
 Mark Ferguson – Seven News presenter
 Matthew Johns – The NRL Footy Show
 Megan Gale – Supermodel
 Michala Banas – Actress and Singer
 Mike Goldman – TV Presenter
 Mikey Robins – TV and Radio Presenter and comedian
 Nikki Webster – Singer/Performer
 Paul Harragon – The NRL Footy Show
 Paul Vautin – The NRL Footy Show
 Paulini Curuenavuli – Singer
 Peter Berner – TV and Radio Presenter
 Peter FitzSimons – Author/Journalist
 Peter Garrett – Singer/Politician
 Peter Sterling – Nine Footy Commentator
 Peter Thompson – Film Reviewer
 Prue MacSween – Media Commentator
 Richard Wilkins – TV Presenter
 Ricki-Lee Coulter – Singer
 Ronan Keating – Singer
 Sam Newman – The AFL Footy Show
 Sam Simmons – Triple J presenter and Comedian
 Sami Lukis – Radio announcer
 Scott Cam – TV Presenter
 Shane Crawford – Former AFL Player
 Shane Jacobson as Kenny Smyth – Film Character
 Shannon Noll – Singer
 Simon Burke – Actor / Play School presenter
 Tania Zaetta – Actress/television presenter
 Tara Moss – Author and Model
 The Umbilical Brothers (aka David Collins and Shane Dundas) – Comedy Duo
 Tim Ferguson – Comedian
 Todd Rixon – Former Dancer
 Tom Burlinson – Actor and Singer
 Toni Pearen – TV Presenter
 Tony Martin – Radio Presenter
 Tracy Grimshaw – TV Presenter
 Wendy Harmer – Radio Presenter
 "Weird Al" Yankovic – Singer
 Zoe Naylor – Actress

2016–2019

Returning
Returning contributors are revived in 2016 include:
David Campbell – Singer
Michala Banas – Actress
Peter Berner – TV and Radio Presenter
Prue MacSween – Media Commentator
Richard Wilkins – Today Show
Tracy Grimshaw – Journalist/TV Presenter

New
New contributors in 2016 include:
Beau Ryan – The NRL Footy Show co-host
Claire Hooper  – Comedian
Dami Im – Singer
Gene Simmons – Singer
Gyton Grantley – Actor
Jack Gleeson – British Actor
Jackie O – Radio Host
Jason Akermanis – Former AFL Player
Jean Kittson – Actress and Comedian
Jeff Goldblum – American Actor
Kevin Rudd – Former Australian Prime Minister
Kat Hoyos – Actor
Lindsay Lohan – American Actress
Martina Navratilova – Tennis Player
Sharon Osbourne – Media Personality
Sylvia Jeffreys – Today Show

Awards
Logie Awards:
Nominated for 2007 Most Popular Light Entertainment Program (lost to Rove Live).

See also 
 50 Years 50 Shows
 List of Australian television series
 List of programs broadcast by Nine Network

References

External links 
 Official website (Australia only)
 
 

2005 Australian television series debuts
2011 Australian television series endings
Anti-Korean sentiment
Australian non-fiction television series
Nine Network original programming
Australian television series revived after cancellation